The West African cricket team was a team representing the countries of Gambia, Ghana, Nigeria and Sierra Leone in international cricket whilst they were an associate member of the International Cricket Council (ICC) between 1976 and 2003. They played in the ICC Trophy on three occasions, in 1982, 1994 and 1997, withdrawing shortly before the start of the 2001 tournament. The team was broken up into its constituent parts in 2003, with Nigeria becoming an associate member of the ICC, the other three affiliates.

Tournament history

ICC Trophy

1979: Did not participate
1982: First round
1986: Did not participate
1990: Did not participate
1994: 17th place
1997: 18th place
2001: Withdrew

Related teams
A West Africa under-19 team contested the 2001 ICC Africa Under-19 Championship in Uganda, which was the inaugural edition of the ICC Africa Under-19 Championships. The squad included Nigerians, Ghanaians, and Gambians, but no Sierra Leoneans. West Africa lost their opening match against Uganda by 278 runs, but rebounded to narrowly win their next fixture against Namibia by 10 runs. This was followed by a 178-run loss to Kenya and a five-wicket loss to East and Central Africa.

See also
West Africa Cricket Council
Gambia national cricket team
Ghana national cricket team
Nigeria national cricket team
Sierra Leone national cricket team

References

West Africa
Cricket in West Africa
Ghana in international cricket
Nigeria in international cricket
Sierra Leone in international cricket
West Africa in international cricket
The Gambia in international cricket